A Cuckoo in the Nest is a 1933 British film, directed by Tom Walls, with a script  by Ben Travers. It is a screen adaption of the original 1925 Aldwych farce of the same title. The film was remade in 1954 as Fast and Loose.

It was made at Lime Grove Studios. The film's sets were designed by Alfred Junge.

Synopsis
Peter and Barbara Wyckham plan to travel by railway from London to a country house in Somerset, but Peter misses the train. Another intending traveller in a similar plight is Marguerite Hickett, an old friend of Peter's from the days before their marriages. They decide to hire a motor car and drive to Somerset, but the car breaks down and they seek refuge at the local inn. Only one bedroom is available, and as it is very clear that the landlady, Mrs Spoker, will not admit an unmarried couple, Peter and Marguerite check in as husband and wife.

Barbara jumps to the conclusion that Peter and Marguerite have run away together. First her parents, Major and Mrs Bone, and then Marguerite's husband and finally Barbara descend on the inn. It becomes clear to everyone that Peter and Marguerite are blameless, and both couples are reconciled.

Cast
Major Bone – Tom Walls*
Peter Wyckham – Ralph Lynn*
Marguerite Hickett – Yvonne Arnaud*
Mrs Spoker – Mary Brough*
The Rev. Cathcart Sloley-Jones – Robertson Hare*
Noony  – Gordon James*
Barbara Wyckham – Veronica Rose
Mrs Bone  – Grace Edwin*
Pinhorn  – Mark Daly
Claude Hickett  – Cecil Parker
Alfred  – Roger Livesey*
Gladys  – Norah Howard
Landlord  – Frank Pettingell
Kate – Joan Brierley
Source: British Film Institute
Cast members marked * were the creators of the roles in the original stage production.

Notes

External links
 

1933 films
1933 comedy films
Aldwych farce
British comedy films
1930s English-language films
British films based on plays
Films directed by Tom Walls
Films set in England
Films set in London
Gainsborough Pictures films
Films shot at Lime Grove Studios
British black-and-white films
1930s British films